Matigramma emmilta is a species of moth in the family Erebidae. It was described by John G. Franclemont in 1986 and is found in North America, where it has been recorded from Arizona, New Mexico and Texas. The habitat consists of mountain canyons and deserts.

The forewing length is 16–19 mm. Adults are on wing from February to October.

The larvae feed on Chrysothamnus species.

References

Further reading
 Lafontaine, J. Donald & Schmidt, B. Christian (2010). "Annotated check list of the Noctuoidea (Insecta, Lepidoptera) of North America north of Mexico". ZooKeys, vol. 40, 1-239.
 Arnett, Ross H. (2000). American Insects: A Handbook of the Insects of America North of Mexico. CRC Press.

External links
Butterflies and Moths of North America
NCBI Taxonomy Browser, Matigramma emmilta

Omopterini
Moths described in 1986